Cytoplasmic dynein 1 light intermediate chain 1 is a protein that in humans is encoded by the DYNC1LI1 gene.

References

Further reading